Brooke Palsson (born 23 April 1993) is a Canadian actress and singer-songwriter.  She was born in Winnipeg, Manitoba, Canada.  She is known for Less Than Kind (2008), Euphoria (2013), Keyhole (2012) and The Colossal Failure of the Modern Relationship (2014).  She won the 2011 Canadian Comedy Award for Best Performance by a Female on television for her work on Less Than Kind.  Her first EP was titled The Willow. She played Melissa Day on the City / Netflix show Between.

She performed during the 2015 Pan American Games in Toronto's Distillery District.

Filmography

Film

Television

References

External links 
 
 

1993 births
Living people
Actresses from Winnipeg
Canadian television actresses
Musicians from Winnipeg
21st-century Canadian women singers
Canadian Comedy Award winners